Pete Van Valkenburg (sometimes referred to as Pete Van Valkenburg) is a former running back in the National Football League (NFL). Van Valkenburg was drafted in the third round of the 1973 NFL Draft by the New Orleans Saints and would play that season with the Buffalo Bills. He split the following season between the Green Bay Packers and the Chicago Bears.
In 1976 he played 12 games for the Saskatchewan Roughriders of the Canadian Football League (CFL), gaining 572 rushing yards and 3 touchdowns on 129 carries, plus 421 yards receiving and 2 touchdown on 43 catches.

See also
 List of college football yearly rushing leaders

References

Players of American football from Salt Lake City
Buffalo Bills players
Green Bay Packers players
Chicago Bears players
American football running backs
BYU Cougars football players
1950 births
Living people